Jean-Michel Vaubien, is a French singer and actor.

Biography 
Jean-Michel studies dancing and acting at the International Academy of Dance in Paris. He plays in several musicals : Fame, Avenue Q, D.I.S.C.O., le spectacle musical...

He's the French voice of several actors on movies and television.

Musicals 
 2013–2014 : D.I.S.CO., le spectacle musical by Agnès Boury and Stéphane Laporte, dir Stéphane Jarny - Folies Bergère, tour
 2012–2013 : Swinging life by and dir Valéry Rodriguez - Bobino, tour
 2011–2012 : Avenue Q by Robert Lopez, Jeff Marx and Jeff Whitty, adaptation Bruno Gaccio, dir Dominique Guillo - Bobino
 2012 : Gospel sur la Colline by Benjamin Faleyras - Casino de Paris
 2010–2011 : Scooby-doo contre les pirates fantômes by Jim Millan, adaptation Grégoire Dey,  dir Rémy Caccia - Tour
 2010–2011 : Fame by José Fernandez, Jacques Levy, Steve Margoshes, dir Ned Grujic - Trianon, tour
 2009–2010 : Kirikou et Karaba by Michel Ocelot, dir Wayne McGregor - Tour
 2008–2009 : Fame by José Fernandez, Jacques Levy, Steve Margoshes, dir Ned Grujic - Théâtre Comedia
 2006–2007 : Dora et les pirates, Louvin Production - Zénith de Paris, tour
 2005–2008 : Swinging fantasy, dir Jim Light - Enghien-les-Bains, Deauville
 2005 : Roméo et Juliette, dir Yohann Azran
 2004 : Les 7 pêchés capitaux, dir Frédéric Strouck - Théâtre du Gymnase
 2000–2001 : Mots d’arts, dir Myriam Delourme - Théâtre Déjazet

Filmography 
 2007 : Soaperette, TV

French dubbing

Cinema 
 2008 : The Lazarus Project : Robbie (Malcolm Goodwin)
 2009 : The Proposal : Jordan (Jerrell Lee)
 2010 : The Search for Santa Paws : Rasta (Christopher Massey)
 2012 : Jeff, Who Lives at Home : Kevin (Evan Ross)
 2013 : Dallas Buyers Club : Sunflower (Bradford Cox)
 2014 : Get on Up : Baby Roy (Keith Robinson)
 2014 : The Maze Runner : Jeff (Jacob Latimore)

Television 
 2008 : Murdoch Mysteries : Driscoll (Robbie Amell)
 2008 : Primeval : Lucien (Jacob Anderson)
 2010 : Hannah Montana : Iyaz
 2010 : Cougar Town : Kevin (LaMarcus Tinker)
 2010 : The Big C : The minister (Teagle F. Bougere)
 2010 : Treme : Dr. Jason Frasor (Marcus Lyle Brown)
 2011 : 12 Dates of Christmas : Michael (Stephan James)  
 2011 : Switched at Birth : Carter (John Keston)  
 2012 : Body of Proof : Marley (Sean Kingston)
 2013–2014 : Almost Human : Luca (Alex Barima)
 2013 : Boardwalk Empire : De-Ernie Coates (Surya Botofasina)
 2013 : Castle (TV series) : Kyle (David Blue)
 2013 : The Newsroom : Zach (Shaun Brown)
 2013 : The Cheating Pact : Detective Joyce (Pancho Demmings)
 2013 : Fir Crazy : Isaac (Arnold Pinnock) 
 2014 : Looking : Frank (O. T. Fagbenle)

Animation 

 2014 : Blaze and the Monster Machines : Crusher (Kevin Michael Richardson)
 2015 : Fresh Beat Band of Spies : voix chantée de Scott (Thomas Hobson)

Discography

Albums 
 2008 : Fame
 2014 : DISCO, le spectacle musical
 2014 : Hansel et Gretel, la comédie musicale
 2015 : Gospel sur la Colline", la comédie musicale
 2015 : "Les Funambules", Double-Album au profit de l'association "Le Refuge"

 Single 
 2013 : Un faux départ, single with the collectif Les grandes voix des comédies musicales''.

References

External links 
 
 Agences artistiques

Living people
French male singers
French male musical theatre actors
French male dancers
21st-century French male actors
French male television actors
French male voice actors
Year of birth missing (living people)